Todd Raymond Golden (born July 7, 1985) is an American-Israeli former basketball player and current head coach of the Florida Gators men's basketball team.

Early life and education
Golden grew up in Phoenix, Arizona, where he graduated from Sunnyslope High School in 2003. Golden played basketball and baseball at Sunnyslope and helped Sunnyslope win the 2002 Arizona 4A state championship in basketball.

In 2003, Golden enrolled at Saint Mary's College of California, where he played guard for the Saint Mary's Gaels from 2004 to 2008. The Gaels would make appearances in the 2005 and 2008 NCAA Tournaments during his career, though he did not appear in their sole 2005 NCAA tournament game, a 65-56 loss to Southern Illinois. Golden played a total of 109 games with 82 starts, averaging 5.5 points, 2.4 rebounds, and 2.5 assists. During his senior season of 2007–08, he ranked second in the nation in assist-to-turnover ratio, and graduated as the Gaels' all-time leader in free-throw percentage (83.2%) before the record was broken by Matthew Dellavedova.

Pro basketball career
From 2008 to 2010, Golden played for Maccabi Haifa in the Israeli Basketball Premier League. In two seasons with Maccabi Haifa, Golden played in 22 games and averaged 2.2 points. Golden also competed in the 2009 Maccabiah Games with the USA Open Team.

Coaching career
After working in the private sector in advertising sales once his playing career was over, Golden entered the college coaching ranks, joining Kyle Smith's staff at Columbia University, first as director of basketball operations, then as an assistant coach. He then took a director of basketball operations position at Auburn under Bruce Pearl, his coach during the 2009 Maccabiah Games. Golden rose to assistant coach with the Tigers in his final season, before reuniting with Smith at San Francisco.

San Francisco 
On April 1, 2019, Golden was officially introduced as the 20th men's basketball coach in Dons history, replacing Smith who departed for Washington State.

In his first season as head coach, Golden led San Francisco to a 22–12 record (9–7 in conference play) and a fifth place finish in the WCC. The Dons' season was ended with an 81–77 loss to Gonzaga in the WCC tournament semifinals.

In 2020–21, the Dons took a step back from the year prior, amassing an 11–14 record (4–9 in conference play) and finishing eighth in the WCC. On November 27, 2020, the Dons defeated No. 4 ranked Virginia 61–60, Virginia's first loss to a non-major opponent since their 2018 NCAA Tournament loss to 16-seeded UMBC.

The 2021–22 season was the most successful of Golden's tenure, achieving a 24–10 (10–6 in conference play) record, and qualifying for the NCAA tournament, the program's first appearance since 1998. They lost in overtime 92–87 to Murray State in the first round. The program's 24 wins represented their highest mark since winning 25 games during the 1981–82 season.

Florida 
On March 18, 2022, Golden was announced as the next men's basketball coach at Florida, following the departure of Mike White to Georgia. His contract with the school is for six years, worth $18 million over the life of the contract.

Personal life
Golden is a dual citizen of the U.S. and Israel. He is married to former Saint Mary's volleyball player Megan York.

Head coaching record

References

1985 births
Living people
American expatriate basketball people in Israel
American men's basketball coaches
American men's basketball players
Auburn Tigers men's basketball coaches
Basketball coaches from Arizona
Basketball players from Phoenix, Arizona
College men's basketball head coaches in the United States
Columbia Lions men's basketball coaches
Israeli Basketball Premier League players
Jewish men's basketball players
Maccabi Haifa B.C. players
Saint Mary's Gaels men's basketball players
San Francisco Dons men's basketball coaches
Florida Gators men's basketball coaches
Sportspeople from Phoenix, Arizona
Maccabiah Games basketball players of the United States